The chestnut-backed jewel-babbler (Ptilorrhoa castanonota) is a species of bird in the family Cinclosomatidae.
It is found in New Guinea.
Its natural habitats are subtropical or tropical moist lowland forests and subtropical or tropical moist montane forests.

References

chestnut-backed jewel-babbler
Birds of New Guinea
chestnut-backed jewel-babbler
Taxonomy articles created by Polbot